Long Lake Outlet drains Long Lake and flows into Cummings Creek east of Hawkinsville, New York.

References 

Rivers of New York (state)
Rivers of Oneida County, New York